The following is a list of players, both past and current, who appeared in at least one game for the New York Yankees franchise, including the 1901–02 Baltimore Orioles, and the 1903–12 New York Highlanders.

Players in Bold are members of the National Baseball Hall of Fame.

Players in Italics have had their numbers retired by the team.

* designates elected as a manager.



A

 David Aardsma, P, 2012
 Jim Abbott, P, 1993–1994
 Harry Ables, P, 1911
 Albert Abreu, P, 2020–2021, 2022–present
 Bobby Abreu, OF, 2006–2008
 Juan Acevedo, P, 2003
 Alfredo Aceves, P, 2008–2010, 2014
 Dustin Ackley, 2B, 2015–2016
 Chance Adams, P, 2018–2019
 David Adams, IF, 2013
 Spencer Adams, IF, 1926
 Doc Adkins, P, 1903
 Steve Adkins, P, 1990
 Luis Aguayo, IF, 1988
 Jack Aker, P, 1969–1972
 Jonathan Albaladejo, P, 2008–2010
 Mike Aldrete, OF, 1996
 Doyle Alexander, P, 1976, 1982–1983
 Walt Alexander, C, 1915–1917
 Johnny Allen, P, 1932–1935
 Neil Allen, P, 1985, 1987–1988
 Bernie Allen, IF, 1972–1973
 Greg Allen, OF, 2021
 Carlos Almanzar, P, 2001
 Erick Almonte, IF, 2001, 2003
 Zoilo Almonte, OF, 2013–2014
 Sandy Alomar Sr., IF, 1974–1976
 Felipe Alou, OF, 1971–1973
 Matty Alou, OF, 1973
 Dell Alston, OF, 1977–1978
 Rubén Amaro Sr., IF, 1966–1968
 Trey Amburgey, OF, 2021
 Jason Anderson, P, 2003, 2005
 John Anderson, OF, 1904–1905
 Rick Anderson, P, 1979
 Ivy Andrews, P, 1931–1932, 1937–1938
 Miguel Andújar, 3B, LF, 2017–2022
 Dean Anna, IF, 2014
 Pete Appleton, P, 1933
 Ángel Aragón, IF, 1914–1917
 Rugger Ardizoia, P, 1947
 Alex Arias, IF, 2002
 Mike Armstrong, P, 1984–1986
 Harry Arndt, OF, 1902
 Brad Arnsberg, P, 1986–1987
 Luis Arroyo, P, 1960–1963
 Tucker Ashford, IF, 1981
 Paul Assenmacher, P, 1993
 Joe Ausanio, P, 1994–1995
 Jimmy Austin, IF, 1909–1910
 Tyler Austin, 1B, 2016–2018
 Chick Autry, C, 1924
 Luis Avilán, P, 2020
 Luis Ayala, P, 2011
 Oscar Azócar, OF, 1990

B

 Loren Babe, IF, 1952–1953
 Harrison Bader, OF, 2022–present
 Stan Bahnsen, P, 1966–1971
 Andrew Bailey, P, 2015
 Bill Bailey, OF, 1911
 Frank Baker, IF, 1916–1922
 Frank Baker, IF, 1970–1971
 Steve Balboni, IF, 1981–1983, 1989–1990
 Neal Ball, IF, 1907–1909
 Anthony Banda, P, 2022
 Scott Bankhead, P, 1995
 Willie Banks, P, 1997–1998
 Manny Bañuelos, P, 2022
 Steve Barber, P, 1967–1968
 Luke Bard, P, 2022–present
 Jesse Barfield, OF, 1989–1992
 Cy Barger, P, 1906–1907
 Ray Barker, IF, 1965–1967
 Frank Barnes, P, 1930
 Honey Barnes, C, 1926
 Ed Barney, OF, 1915
 Chris Başak, IF, 2007
 George Batten, IF, 1912
 Hank Bauer, OF, 1948–1959
 Paddy Baumann, IF, 1915–1917
 Don Baylor, DH, 1983–1985
 Walter Beall, P, 1924–1927
 T. J. Beam, P, 2006
 Colter Bean, P, 2005–2007
 Jim Beattie, P, 1978–1979
 Rich Beck, P, 1965
 Zinn Beck, IF, 1918
 Fred Beene, P, 1972–1974
 Joe Beggs, P, 1938
 Rudy Bell, OF, 1907
 Zeke Bella, OF, 1957
 Mark Bellhorn, IF, 2005
 Clay Bellinger, OF, 1996–2002
 Carlos Beltrán, OF, 2014–2016
 Benny Bengough, C, 1923–1930
 Andrew Benintendi, OF, 2022–present
 Juan Beníquez, OF, 1979
 Armando Benítez, P, 2003
 Lou Berberet, C, 1954–1955
 Dave Bergman, IF, 1975–1977
 Lance Berkman, IF, 2010
 Walter Bernhardt, P, 1918
 Juan Bernhardt, DH, 1976
 Yogi Berra, C, 1946–1963
 Dale Berra, IF, 1985–1986
 Ángel Berroa, IF, 2009
 Dellin Betances, P, 2011, 2013–2019
 Wilson Betemit, IF, 2007–2008
 Bill Bevens, P, 1944–1947
 Monte Beville, C, 1903–1904
 Harry Billiard, P, 1908
 Bruce Billings, P, 2014
 Doug Bird, P, 1980–1981
 Greg Bird, IF, 2015, 2017–2019
 Ewell Blackwell, P, 1952–1953
 Rick Bladt, OF, 1975
 Paul Blair, OF, 1977–1980
 Walter Blair, C, 1907–1911
 Johnny Blanchard, OF, 1955–1965
 Gil Blanco, P, 1965
 Wade Blasingame, P, 1972
 Steve Blateric, P, 1972
 Gary Blaylock, P, 1959
 Richard Bleier, P, 2016
 Curt Blefary, OF, 1970–1971
 Elmer Bliss, P, 1903–1904
 Ron Blomberg, DH, 1969–1976
 Mike Blowers, IF, 1989–1991
 Eddie Bockman, IF, 1946
 Ping Bodie, OF, 1918–1921
 Len Boehmer, IF, 1969–1971
 Brian Boehringer, P, 1995–1997, 2001
 Brennan Boesch, OF, 2013
 Wade Boggs, IF, 1993–1997
 Don Bollweg, IF, 1953
 Bobby Bonds, OF, 1975
 Ricky Bones, P, 1996
 Tiny Bonham, P, 1940–1946
 Juan Bonilla, IF, 1985, 1987
 Lute Boone, IF, 1913–1916
 Aaron Boone, IF, 2003
 Chris Bootcheck, P, 2013
 Frenchy Bordagaray, OF, 1941
 Rich Bordi, P, 1985, 1987
 Joe Borowski, P, 1997–1998
 Hank Borowy, P, 1942–1945
 Babe Borton, IF, 1913
 Daryl Boston, OF, 1994
 Jim Bouton, P, 1962–1968
 Clete Boyer, IF, 1959–1966
 Andrew Brackman, P, 2011
 Ryan Bradley, P, 1998
 Scott Bradley, C, 1984–1985
 Neal Brady, P, 1915–1917
 Darren Bragg, OF, 2001
 Ralph Branca, P, 1954
 Norm Branch, P, 1941–1942
 Marshall Brant, IF, 1980
 Rob Brantly, C, 2021-2022
 Garland Braxton, P, 1925–1926
 Don Brennan, P, 1933
 Jim Brenneman, P, 1965
 Roger Bresnahan, C, 1901–1902
 Ken Brett, P, 1976
 Marv Breuer, P, 1939–1943
 Billy Brewer, P, 1996
 Fritz Brickell, IF, 1958–1959
 Jim Brideweser, IF, 1951–1953
 Marshall Bridges, P, 1962–1963
 Harry Bright, IF, 1963–1964
 Reid Brignac, IF, 2013
 Ed Brinkman, IF, 1975
 Chris Britton, P, 2007–2008
 Zack Britton, P, 2018–present
 Johnny Broaca, P, 1934–1937
 King Brockett, P, 1907–1911
 Steve Brodie, OF, 1901
 Jim Bronstad, P, 1959
 Tom Brookens, IF, 1989
 Scott Brosius, IF, 1997–2001
 Jim Brower, P, 2007
 Bob Brower, OF, 1989
 Boardwalk Brown, P, 1914–1915
 Bobby Brown, IF, 1946–1954
 Bobby Brown, OF, 1979–1981
 Curt Brown, P, 1984
 Hal Brown, P, 1962
 Jumbo Brown, P, 1932–1936
 Kevin Brown, P, 2004–2005
 Jay Bruce, OF, 2021
 Brian Bruney, P, 2006–2009
 Jim Bruske, P, 1998
 Billy Bryan, C, 1966–1967
 Jess Buckles, P, 1916
 Mike Buddie, P, 1998–1999
 Jay Buhner, OF, 1987–1988
 Danny Burawa, P, 2015
 Bill Burbach, P, 1969–1971
 Lew Burdette, P, 1950
 Tim Burke, P, 1992
 A. J. Burnett, P, 2009–2011
 George Burns, IF, 1928–1929
 C. B. Burns, PH, 1902
 Alex Burr, OF, 1914
 Ray Burris, P, 1979
 Homer Bush, IF, 1997–1998, 2004
 Joe Bush, P, 1922–1924
 Tom Buskey, P, 1973–1974
 Billy Butler, 1B, 2016
 Ike Butler, P, 1902
 Ralph Buxton, P, 1949
 Joe Buzas, IF, 1945
 Harry Byrd, P, 1954
 Sammy Byrd, OF, 1929–1934
 Tommy Byrne, P, 1943–1951, 1954–1957
 Marty Bystrom, P, 1984–1985

C

 César Cabral, P, 2013–2014
 Melky Cabrera, OF, 2005–2009
 Oswaldo Cabrera, IF/OF, 2022–present
 Greg Cadaret, P, 1989–1992
 Miguel Cairo, IF, 2004, 2006–2007
 Ray Caldwell, P, 1910–1918
 Charlie Caldwell, P, 1925
 Johnny Callison, OF, 1972–1973
 Howie Camp, OF, 1917
 Bert Campaneris, IF, 1983
 Archie Campbell, P, 1928
 John Candelaria, P, 1988–1989
 Andy Cannizaro, IF, 2006
 Robinson Canó, IF, 2005–2013
 José Canseco, OF, 2000
 Mike Cantwell, P, 1916
 Chris Capuano, P, 2014–2015
 Andy Carey, IF, 1952–1960
 Buddy Carlyle, P, 2011
 Roy Carlyle, OF, 1926
 Duke Carmel, OF, 1965
 David Carpenter, P, 2015
 Matt Carpenter, INF/DH, 2022
 Dick Carroll, P, 1909
 Ownie Carroll, P, 1930
 Tom Carroll, IF, 1955–1956
 Chris Carter, 1B/DH, 2017
 Chuck Cary, P, 1989–1991
 Hugh Casey, P, 1949
 Kevin Cash, C, 2009
 Alberto Castillo, C, 2002
 Roy Castleton, P, 1907
 Bill Castro, P, 1981
 Miguel Castro, P, 2022–present
 Starlin Castro, 2B, 2016–2017
 Danny Cater, IF, 1970–1971
 Rick Cerone, C, 1980–1984, 1987, 1990
 Bob Cerv, OF, 1951–1956, 1960–1962
 Francisco Cervelli, C, 2008–2014
 Luis Cessa, P, 2016–2021
 Shawn Chacón, P, 2005–2006
 Joba Chamberlain, P, 2007–2013
 Chris Chambliss, IF, 1974–1979, 1988
 Frank Chance, IF, 1913–1914
 Spud Chandler, P, 1937–1947
 Les Channell, OF, 1910–1914
 Darrin Chapin, P, 1991
 Aroldis Chapman, P, 2016, 2017–present
 Ben Chapman, OF, 1930–1936
 Mike Chartak, OF, 1940–1942
 Hal Chase, IF, 1905–1913
 Eric Chavez, IF, 2011–2012
 Jack Chesbro, P, 1903–1909
 Randy Choate, P, 2000–2003
 Ji-Man Choi, 1B, 2017
 Justin Christian, OF, 2008
 Clay Christiansen, P, 1984
 Al Cicotte, P, 1957
 Anthony Claggett, P, 2009
 Preston Claiborne, P, 2013–2014
 Allie Clark, OF, 1947
 George Clark, P, 1913
 Jack Clark, OF, 1988
 Tony Clark, IF, 2004
 Horace Clarke, IF, 1965–1974
 Walter Clarkson, P, 1904–1907
 Brandon Claussen, P, 2003
 Ken Clay, P, 1977–1979
 Roger Clemens, P, 1999–2003, 2007
 Pat Clements, P, 1987–1988
 Tex Clevenger, P, 1961–1962
 Lou Clinton, OF, 1966–1967
 Tyler Clippard, P, 2007, 2016–2017
 Al Closter, P, 1971–1972
 Andy Coakley, P, 1911
 Jim Coates, P, 1956–1962
 Jim Cockman, IF, 1905
 Rich Coggins, OF, 1975–1976
 Phil Coke, P, 2008–2009, 2016
 Rocky Colavito, OF, 1968
 A. J. Cole, P, 2018
 Gerrit Cole, P, 2020–present
 King Cole, P, 1914–1915
 Rip Coleman, P, 1955–1956
 Jerry Coleman, IF, 1949–1957
 Curt Coleman, IF, 1912
 Michael Coleman, OF, 2001
 Rip Collins, P, 1920–1921
 Pat Collins, C, 1926–1928
 Rip Collins, C, 1944
 Joe Collins, IF, 1948–1957
 Orth Collins, OF, 1904
 Dave Collins, OF, 1982
 Frank Colman, OF, 1946–1947
 Bartolo Colón, P, 2011
 Loyd Colson, P, 1970
 Earle Combs, OF, 1924–1935
 David Cone, P, 1995–2000
 Tom Connelly, OF, 1920–1921
 Joe Connor, C, 1905
 Wid Conroy, IF, 1903–1908
 José Contreras, P, 2003–2004
 Andy Cook, P, 1993
 Doc Cook, OF, 1913–1916
 Dusty Cooke, OF, 1930–1932
 Ron Coomer, IF, 2002
 Phil Cooney, IF, 1905
 Johnny Cooney, OF, 1944
 Guy Cooper, P, 1914
 Don Cooper, P, 1985
 Garrett Cooper, 1B, 2017
 Nestor Cortes Jr., P, 2019, 2021–present
 Dan Costello, OF, 1913
 Henry Cotto, OF, 1985–1987
 Ensign Cottrell, P, 1915
 Clint Courtney, C, 1951
 Ernie Courtney, IF, 1902–1903
 Stan Coveleski, P, 1928
 Billy Cowan, OF, 1969
 Joe Cowley, P, 1984–1985
 Casey Cox, P, 1972–1973
 Bobby Cox, IF, 1968–1969
 Birdie Cree, OF, 1908–1915
 Lou Criger, C, 1910
 Herb Crompton, C, 1945
 Jack Cronin, P, 1902
 Bubba Crosby, OF, 2004–2006
 Frankie Crosetti, IF, 1932–1948
 Iván Cruz, IF, 1997
 José Cruz, OF, 1988
 Luis Cruz, IF, 2013

 Jack Cullen, P, 1962–1966
 Roy Cullenbine, OF, 1942
 Nick Cullop, P, 1916–1917
 Nick Cullop, OF, 1926
 John Cumberland, P, 1968–1970
 Jim Curry, IF, 1911
 Fred Curtis, IF, 1905
 Chad Curtis, OF, 1997–1999
 Colin Curtis, OF, 2010

D

 Babe Dahlgren, IF, 1937–1940
 Bud Daley, P, 1961–1964
 Matt Daley, P, 2013–2014
 Tom Daley, OF, 1914–1915
 Johnny Damon, OF, 2006–2009
 Bert Daniels, OF, 1910–1913
 Bob Davidson, P, 1989
 Kyle Davies, P, 2015
 Chili Davis, OF, 1998–1999
 George Davis, P, 1912
 Ike Davis, 1B, 2016
 Jonathan Davis, OF, 2021
 Kiddo Davis, OF, 1926
 Lefty Davis, OF, 1903
 Ron Davis, P, 1978–1981
 Russ Davis, IF, 1993–1995
 Brian Dayett, OF, 1983–1984
 John Deering, P, 1903
 Jim Deidel, C, 1974
 Iván DeJesús, IF, 1986
 Frank Delahanty, OF, 1905–1906, 1908
 Wilson Delgado, IF, 2000
 Bobby Del Greco, OF, 1957–1958
 David Dellucci, OF, 2003
 Jim Delsing, OF, 1949–1950
 Joe DeMaestri, IF, 1960–1961
 Ray Demmitt, OF, 1909
 Rick Dempsey, C, 1973–1976
 Bucky Dent, IF, 1977–1982
 Jorge DePaula, P, 2003–2005
 Claud Derrick, IF, 1913
 Russ Derry, OF, 1944–1945
 Matt DeSalvo, P, 2007
 Jim Deshaies, P, 1984
 Jimmie DeShong, P, 1934–1935
 Orestes Destrade, IF, 1987
 Charlie Devens, P, 1932–1934
 Al DeVormer, C, 1921–1922
 Joe DiMaggio, OF, 1936–1951
 Chris Dickerson, OF, 2011–2012
 Bill Dickey, C, 1928–1946
 Murry Dickson, P, 1958
 Pop Dillon, IF, 1902
 Kerry Dineen, OF, 1975–1976
 Craig Dingman, P, 2000
 Art Ditmar, P, 1957–1961
 Sonny Dixon, P, 1956
 Pat Dobson, P, 1973–1975
 Cozy Dolan, OF, 1911–1912
 Atley Donald, P, 1938–1945
 Josh Donaldson, 3B, 2022–present
 Mike Donlin, OF, 1901
 Bill Donovan, P, 1915–1916
 Mike Donovan, IF, 1908
 Brian Dorsett, C, 1989–1990
 Octavio Dotel, P, 2006
 Richard Dotson, P, 1988–1989
 Patsy Dougherty, OF, 1904–1906
 John Dowd, IF, 1912
 Al Downing, P, 1961–1969
 Slow Joe Doyle, P, 1906–1910
 Jack Doyle, IF, 1905
 Brian Doyle, IF, 1978–1980
 Doug Drabek, P, 1986
 Bill Drescher, C, 1944–1946
 Stephen Drew, IF, 2014–2015
 Karl Drews, P, 1946–1948
 Lew Drill, C/IF, 1902
 Brandon Drury, IF, 2018
 Monk Dubiel, P, 1944–1945
 Joe Dugan, IF, 1922–1928
 Ryan Dull, P, 2019
 Mariano Duncan, IF, 1996–1997
 Shelley Duncan, OF, 2007–2009
 Jack Dunn, IF, 1901
 Mike Dunn, P, 2009
 Ryne Duren, P, 1958–1961
 Leo Durocher, IF, 1925–1929
 Cedric Durst, OF, 1927–1930

E

 Mike Easler, OF, 1986–1987
 Rawly Eastwick, P, 1978
 Foster Edwards, P, 1930
 Doc Edwards, C, 1965
 Robert Eenhoorn, IF, 1994–1996
 Scott Effross, P, 2022–present
 Dave Eiland, P, 1988–1991, 1995
 Darrell Einertson, P, 2000
 Kid Elberfeld, IF, 1903–1909
 Gene Elliott, OF, 1911
 Dock Ellis, P, 1976–1977
 John Ellis, IF, 1969–1972
 Jacoby Ellsbury, OF, 2014–2017
 Kevin Elster, IF, 1994–1995
 Red Embree, P, 1948
 Alan Embree, P, 2005
 Edwin Encarnacion, IF, 2019
 Clyde Engle, OF, 1909–1910
 Jack Enright, P, 1917
 Morgan Ensberg, IF, 2008
 Nathan Eovaldi, P, 2015–2016
 Cody Eppley, P, 2012–2013
 Todd Erdos, P, 1998–2000
 Roger Erickson, P, 1982–1983
 Scott Erickson, P, 2006
 Félix Escalona, IF, 2004–2005
 Juan Espino, C, 1982–1986
 Álvaro Espinoza, IF, 1988–1991
 Bobby Estalella, C, 2001
 Thairo Estrada, IF, 2019–2020
 Nick Etten, IF, 1943–1946
 Barry Evans, IF, 1982

F

 Charlie Fallon, --, 1905
 Kyle Farnsworth, P, 2006–2008
 Steve Farr, P, 1991–1993
 Doc Farrell, IF, 1932–1933
 Sal Fasano, C, 2006
 Alex Ferguson, P, 1918–1921, 1925
 Frank Fernández, C, 1967–1969
 Tony Fernández, IF, 1995
 Mike Ferraro, IF, 1966–1968
 Wes Ferrell, P, 1938–1939
 Tom Ferrick, P, 1950–1951
 Chick Fewster, IF, 1917–1922
 Cecil Fielder, IF, 1996–1997
 Mike Figga, C, 1997–1999
 Cole Figueroa IF, 2015
 Ed Figueroa, P, 1976–1980
 Pete Filson, P, 1987
 Happy Finneran, P, 1918
 Mike Fischlin, IF, 1986
 Brian Fisher, P, 1985–1986
 Gus Fisher, C, 1912
 Ray Fisher, P, 1910–1917
 Mike Fitzgerald, OF, 1911
 John Flaherty, C, 2003–2005
 Ramon Flores, OF, 2015
 Estevan Florial, OF, 2020–present
 Tim Foli, IF, 1984
 Ray Fontenot, P, 1983–1984
 Barry Foote, C, 1981–1982
 Russ Ford, P, 1909–1913
 Whitey Ford, P, 1950–1967
 Ben Ford, P, 2000
 Mike Ford, IF, 2019–2021
 Frank Foreman, P, 1901–1902
 Tony Fossas, P, 1999
 Eddie Foster, IF, 1910
 Jack Fournier, IF, 1918
 Frank Foutz, IF, 1901
 Dustin Fowler, OF, 2017
 Andy Fox, IF, 1996–1997
 Jeff Francis, P, 2014
 Ray Francis, P, 1925
 Ben Francisco, OF, 2013
 Wayne Franklin, P, 2005
 Clint Frazier, OF, 2017–2021
 George Frazier, P, 1981–1983
 Todd Frazier, 3B, 2017
 Mark Freeman, P, 1959
 Ray French, IF, 1920
 Lonny Frey, IF, 1947–1948
 Bob Friend, P, 1966
 John Frill, P, 1910
 Bill Fulton, P, 1987
 Dave Fultz, OF, 1903–1905
 Liz Funk, OF, 1929

G

 John Gabler, P, 1959–1960
 Joe Gallagher, OF, 1939
 Mike Gallego, IF, 1992–1994
 Giovanny Gallegos, P, 2017–2018
 Joey Gallo, OF, 2021–2022
 Oscar Gamble, OF, 1976, 1979–1984
 Ben Gamel, OF, 2016
 John Ganzel, IF, 1903–1904
 Mike Garbark, C, 1944–1945
 Dámaso García, IF, 1978–1979
 Deivi García, P, 2020–present
 Freddy García, P, 2011–2012
 Jaime García, P, 2017
 Karim García, OF, 2002–2003
 Billy Gardner, IF, 1961–1962
 Brett Gardner, OF, 2008–2021
 Earle Gardner, IF, 1908–1912
 Rob Gardner, P, 1970–1972
 Steve Garrison, P, 2011
 Ned Garvin, P, 1904
 Milt Gaston, P, 1924
 Chad Gaudin, P, 2009, 2010
 Mike Gazella, IF, 1923–1928
 Cory Gearrin, P, 2019
 Joe Gedeon, IF, 1916–1917
 Lou Gehrig, IF, 1923–1939
 Bob Geren, C, 1988–1991
 Domingo German, P, 2017–2019, 2021–present
 Al Gettel, P, 1945–1946
 Jason Giambi, IF, 2002–2008
 Joe Giard, P, 1927
 Jake Gibbs, C, 1962–1971
 Sam Gibson, P, 1930
 Dan Giese, P, 2008
 Paul Gibson, P, 1993–1994, 1996
 Luis Gil, P, 2021–present
 Billy Gilbert, IF, 1902
 Frank Gilhooley, OF, 1913–1918
 Charles Gipson, OF, 2003
 Joe Girardi, C, 1996–1999
 Chris Gittens IF, 2021
 Fred Glade, P, 1908
 Frank Gleich, OF, 1919–1920
 Joe Glenn, C, 1932–1938
 Greg Golson, OF, 2010–2011
 Lefty Gomez, P, 1930–1942
 Jesse Gonder, C, 1960–1961
 Alberto González, IF, 2007–2008, 2013
 Fernando González, IF, 1974
 Marwin González, UTIL, 2022–present
 Pedro González, IF, 1963–1965
 Wilbur Good, OF, 1905
 Dwight Gooden, P, 1996–1997, 2000
 Art Goodwin, P, 1905
 Nick Goody, P, 2015-2016
 Brian Gordon, P, 2011
 Tom Gordon, P, 2004–2005
 Joe Gordon, IF, 1938–1946
 Tom Gorman, P, 1952–1954
 Rich Gossage, P, 1978–1983, 1989
 Dick Gossett, C, 1913–1914
 Larry Gowell, P, 1972
 Johnny Grabowski, C, 1927–1929
 Alex Graman, P, 2004–2005
 Curtis Granderson, OF, 2010–2013
 Wayne Granger, P, 1973
 Sonny Gray, P, 2017–2018
 Ted Gray, P, 1955
 Eli Grba, P, 1959–1960
 Chad Green, P, 2016–present
 Nick Green, IF, 2006
 Shane Greene, P, 2014
 Todd Greene, C, 2001
 Paddy Greene, IF, 1903
 Didi Gregorius, SS, 2015–2019
 Ken Griffey Sr., OF, 1982–1986
 Mike Griffin, P, 1979–1981
 Clark Griffith, P, 1903–1907
 Bob Grim, P, 1954–1958
 Burleigh Grimes, P, 1934
 Oscar Grimes, IF, 1943–1946
 Jason Grimsley, P, 1999–2000
 Lee Grissom, P, 1940
 Buddy Groom, P, 2005
 Cecilio Guante, P, 1987–1988
 Lee Guetterman, P, 1988–1992
 Ron Guidry, P, 1975–1988
 Aaron Guiel, OF, 2006
 Brad Gulden, C, 1979–1980
 Don Gullett, P, 1977–1978
 Bill Gullickson, P, 1987
 Randy Gumpert, P, 1946–1948
 Larry Gura, P, 1974–1975
 Freddy Guzmán, OF, 2009
 Ronald Guzmán, IF, 2022

H

 John Habyan, P, 1990–1993
 Bump Hadley, P, 1936–1940
 Kent Hadley, IF, 1960
 Travis Hafner, DH, 2013
 Noodles Hahn, P, 1906
 Ed Hahn, OF, 1905–1906
 Hinkey Haines, OF, 1923
 Jerry Hairston Jr. IF/OF, 2009
 George Halas, OF, 1919
 Bob Hale, IF, 1961
 Dad Hale, P, 1902
 David Hale, P, 2018, 2019-2020
 Jimmie Hall, OF, 1969
 Mel Hall, OF, 1989–1992
 Brad Halsey, P, 2004
 Roger Hambright, P, 1971
 Steve Hamilton, P, 1963–1970
 Chris Hammond, P, 2003
 Mike Handiboe, OF, 1911
 Jim Hanley, P, 1913
 Truck Hannah, C, 1918–1920
 Ron Hansen, IF, 1970–1971
 Harry Hanson, C, 1913
 J. A. Happ, P, 2018–2020
 Jim Hardin, P, 1971
 Bubbles Hargrave, C, 1930
 Harry Harper, P, 1921
 Toby Harrah, IF, 1984
 Greg Harris, P, 1994
 Joe Harris, IF, 1914
 Jimmy Hart, IF, 1901
 Jim Ray Hart, IF, 1973–1974
 Roy Hartzell, OF, 1911–1916
 Joe Harvey, P, 2019
 Buddy Hassett, IF, 1942
 Ron Hassey, C, 1985–1986
 Andy Hawkins, P, 1989–1991
 LaTroy Hawkins, P, 2008
 Chicken Hawks, IF, 1921
 Charlie Hayes, IF, 1992, 1996–1997
 Chase Headley, 3B, 2014–2017
 Fran Healy, C, 1976–1978
 Andrew Heaney, P, 2021
 Mike Heath, C, 1978
 Neal Heaton, P, 1993
 Adeiny Hechavarria, IF, 2018
 Don Heffner, IF, 1934–1937
 Mike Hegan, IF, 1964–1967, 1973–1974
 Fred Heimach, P, 1928–1929
 Crese Heismann, P, 1902
 Woodie Held, IF, 1954, 1957
 Ben Heller, P, 2016–2017, 2019-2020
 Charlie Hemphill, OF, 1908–1911
 Rollie Hemsley, C, 1942–1944
 Bill Henderson, P, 1930
 Rickey Henderson, OF, 1984–1989
 Harvey Hendrick, IF, 1923–1924
 Ellie Hendricks, C, 1976–1977
 Tim Hendryx, OF, 1915–1917
 Sean Henn, P, 2005–2007
 Tommy Henrich, OF, 1937–1950
 Bill Henry, P, 1966
 Drew Henson, IF, 2002–2003
 Félix Heredia, P, 2003–2004
 Xavier Hernandez, P, 1994
 Orlando Hernández, P, 1998–2002, 2004
 Adrian Hernández, P, 2001–2002
 Michel Hernandez, C, 2003
 Leo Hernández, IF, 1986
 Ronald Herrera, P, 2017
 Ed Herrmann, C, 1975
 Aaron Hicks, OF, 2016–present
 Kyle Higashioka, C, 2017–present
 Hugh High, OF, 1915–1918
 Oral Hildebrand, P, 1939–1940
 Jesse Hill, OF, 1935
 Glenallen Hill, OF, 2000
 Rich Hill, P, 2014
 Shawn Hillegas, P, 1992
 Frank Hiller, P, 1946–1949
 Mack Hillis, IF, 1924
 Eric Hinske, OF, 2009
 Rich Hinton, P, 1972
 Sterling Hitchcock, P, 1992–1995, 2001–2003
 Myril Hoag, OF, 1931–1938
 Butch Hobson, IF, 1982
 Chet Hoff, P, 1911–1913
 Danny Hoffman, OF, 1906–1907
 Solly Hofman, OF, 1916
 Fred Hofmann, C, 1919–1925
 Bill Hogg, P, 1905–1908
 Bobby Hogue, P, 1951–1952
 Ken Holcombe, P, 1945
 Bill Holden, OF, 1913–1914
 Jonathan Holder, P, 2016–2020
 Al Holland, P, 1986–1987
 Matt Holliday, DH, 2017
 Ken Holloway, P, 1930
 Clay Holmes, P, 2021–present
 Darren Holmes, P, 1998
 Fred Holmes, C, 1903
 Roger Holt, IF, 1980
 Ken Holtzman, P, 1976–1978
 Rick Honeycutt, P, 1995
 Wally Hood, P, 1949
 Don Hood, P, 1979
 Johnny Hopp, OF, 1950–1952
 Shags Horan, OF, 1924
 Ralph Houk, C, 1947–1954
 Elston Howard, C, 1955–1967
 Matt Howard, IF, 1996
 Steve Howe, P, 1991–1996
 Harry Howell, P, 1901–1903
 Jay Howell, P, 1982–1984
 Dick Howser, IF, 1967–1968
 Waite Hoyt, P, 1921–1930
 Rex Hudler, IF, 1984–1985
 David Huff, P, 2013, 2014
 Chad Huffman, OF, 2010
 Charles Hudson, P, 1987–1988
 Tom Hughes, P, 1902, 1904
 Tom L. Hughes, P, 1906–1910
 Phil Hughes, P, 2007–2013
 Keith Hughes, OF, 1987
 John Hummel, IF, 1918
 Mike Humphreys, OF, 1991–1993
 Ken Hunt, OF, 1959–1960
 Catfish Hunter, P, 1975–1979
 Billy Hunter, IF, 1955–1956
 Mark Hutton, P, 1993–1994, 1996
 Ham Hyatt, IF, 1918

I

 Raúl Ibañez, OF, 2012
 Ryota Igarashi, P, 2012
 Kei Igawa, P, 2007–2008
 Pete Incaviglia, OF, 1997
 Hideki Irabu, P, 1997–1999
 Travis Ishikawa, IF, 2013

J

 Fred Jacklitsch, C, 1905
 Grant Jackson, P, 1976
 Jim Jackson, OF, 1901
 Reggie Jackson, OF, 1977–1981
 Johnny James, P, 1958–1961
 Dion James, OF, 1992–1996
 Stan Javier, OF, 1984
 Domingo Jean, P, 1993
 Stan Jefferson, OF, 1989
 Jackie Jensen, OF, 1950–1952
 Mike Jerzembeck, P, 1998
 Derek Jeter, SS, 1995–2014
 D'Angelo Jiménez, IF, 1999
 Elvio Jiménez, OF, 1964
 Brett Jodie, P, 2001
 Tommy John, P, 1979–1982, 1986–1989
 Alex Johnson, OF, 1974–1975
 Billy Johnson, IF, 1943–1951
 Cliff Johnson, DH, 1977–1979
 Darrell Johnson, C, 1957–1958
 Deron Johnson, IF, 1960–1961
 Don Johnson, P, 1947–1950
 Ernie Johnson, IF, 1923–1925
 Hank Johnson, P, 1925–1932
 Jeff Johnson, P, 1991–1993
 Johnny Johnson, P, 1944
 Kelly Johnson, 2014
 Ken Johnson, P, 1969
 Lance Johnson, OF, 2000
 Nick Johnson, IF, 2001–2003, 2010
 Otis Johnson, IF, 1911
 Randy Johnson, P, 2005–2006
 Russ Johnson, IF, 2005
 Roy Johnson, OF, 1936–1937
 Jay Johnstone, OF, 1978–1979
 Andruw Jones, OF, 2011–2012
 Darryl Jones, DH, 1979
 Garrett Jones, OF, 2015
 Gary Jones, P, 1970–1971
 Jimmy Jones, P, 1989–1990
 Ruppert Jones, OF, 1980
 Sad Sam Jones, P, 1922–1926
 Tom Jones, IF, 1902
 Slats Jordan, IF/OF, 1901–1902
 Tim Jordan, IF, 1903
 Art Jorgens, C, 1929–1939
 Félix José, OF, 2000
 Corban Joseph, IF, 2013
 Jeff Juden, P, 1999
 Aaron Judge, OF, 2016–present
 Mike Jurewicz, P, 1965
 David Justice, OF, 2000–2001

K

 Jim Kaat, P, 1979–1980
 Tommy Kahnle, P, 2017–2020
 Scott Kamieniecki, P, 1991–1996
 Bob Kammeyer, P, 1978–1979
 Frank Kane, OF, 1919
 Bill Karlon, OF, 1930
 Bill Karns, P, 1901
 Herb Karpel, P, 1946
 Steve Karsay, P, 2002, 2004–2005
 Jeff Karstens, P, 2006–2007
 Jack Katoll, P, 1902
 Benny Kauff, OF, 1912
 Curt Kaufman, P, 1982–1983
 Austin Kearns, OF, 2010
 Eddie Kearse, C, 1942
 Ray Keating, P, 1912–1918
 Bobby Keefe, P, 1907
 Willie Keeler, OF, 1903–1909
 Randy Keisler, P, 2000–2001
 Bill Keister, IF, 1901
 Mike Kekich, P, 1969–1973
 Charlie Keller, OF, 1939–1949, 1952
 Joe Kelley, OF, 1902
 Shawn Kelley, P, 2013–2014
 Pat Kelly, IF, 1991–1997
 Roberto Kelly, OF, 1987–1992, 2000
 Steve Kemp, OF, 1983–1984
 Ian Kennedy, P, 2007–2009
 John Kennedy, IF, 1967
 Jerry Kenney, IF, 1967–1972
 Matt Keough, P, 1983
 Jimmy Key, P, 1993–1996
 Steve Kiefer, IF, 1989
 Isiah Kiner-Falefa, SS, 2022–present
 Mike King, P, 2019–present
 Harry Kingman, IF, 1914
 Dave Kingman, OF, 1977
 Fred Kipp, P, 1960
 Frank Kitson, P, 1907
 Ron Kittle, OF, 1986–1987
 Ted Kleinhans, P, 1936
 Red Kleinow, C, 1904–1910
 Ed Klepfer, P, 1911–1913
 Ron Klimkowski, P, 1969–1970, 1972
 Steve Kline, P, 1970–1974
 Corey Kluber, P, 2021
 Mickey Klutts, IF, 1976–1978
 Bill Knickerbocker, IF, 1938–1940
 Brandon Knight, P, 2001–2002
 John Knight, IF, 1909–1911, 1913
 Chuck Knoblauch, IF, 1998–2001
 Mark Koenig, IF, 1925–1930
 Brody Koerner, P, 2021
 Jim Konstanty, P, 1954–1956
 George Kontos, P, 2011, 2018
 Andy Kosco, OF, 1968
 Pete Kozma, IF, 2017
 Steve Kraly, P, 1953
 Jack Kramer, P, 1951
 Eric Kratz, C, 2017, 2020
 Brooks Kriske, P, 2020–2021
 Ernie Krueger, C, 1915
 Dick Kryhoski, IF, 1949
 Tony Kubek, IF, 1957–1965
 Johnny Kucks, P, 1955–1959
 Bill Kunkel, P, 1963
 Hiroki Kuroda, P, 2012–2014
 Bob Kuzava, P, 1951–1954

L

 Aaron Laffey, P, 2011
 Brandon Laird, IF, 2011
 Dave LaRoche, P, 1981–1983
 Brady Lail, P, 2019
 Joe Lake, P, 1908–1909
 Bill Lamar, OF, 1917–1919
 Ryan LaMarre, OF, 2021
 Hal Lanier, IF, 1972–1973
 Dave LaPoint, P, 1989–1990
 Frank LaPorte, IF, 1905–1910
 Don Larsen, P, 1955–1959
 Lyn Lary, IF, 1929–1934
 Chris Latham, OF, 2003
 Tacks Latimer, C, 1901
 Bob Lawson, P, 1902
 Marcus Lawton, OF, 1989
 Matt Lawton, OF, 2005
 Gene Layden, OF, 1915
 Tommy Layne, P, 2016–2017
 Tony Lazzeri, IF, 1926–1937
 Tim Leary, P, 1990–1992
 Wade LeBlanc, P, 2014
 Ricky Ledée, OF, 1998–2000
 Travis Lee, IF, 2004
 Joe Lefebvre, OF, 1980
 Al Leiter, P, 1987–1989, 2005–2006
 Mark Leiter, P, 1990
 Frank Leja, IF, 1954–1955
 Jack Lelivelt, OF, 1912–1913
 DJ LeMahieu, IF, 2019–present
 Eddie Leon, IF, 1975
 Louis Leroy, P, 1905–1906
 Chris Leroux, P, 2014
 Ed Levy, OF, 1942–1944
 Duffy Lewis, OF, 1919–1920
 Jim Lewis, P, 1982
 Terry Ley, P, 1971
 Jim Leyritz, C, 1990–1996, 1999–2000
 Cory Lidle, P, 2006
 Jon Lieber, P, 2004
 Brent Lillibridge, UT, 2013
 Ted Lilly, P, 2000–2002
 Paul Lindblad, P, 1978
 Johnny Lindell, OF, 1941–1950
 Jacob Lindgren, P, 2015
 Phil Linz, IF, 1962–1965
 Bryan Little, IF, 1986
 Jack Little, OF, 1912
 Clem Llewellyn, P, 1922
 Graeme Lloyd, P, 1996–1998
 Jonathan Loáisiga, P, 2018–present
 Esteban Loaiza, P, 2004
 Tim Locastro, OF, 2021–present
 Gene Locklear, OF, 1976–1977
 Kenny Lofton, OF, 2004
 Boone Logan, P, 2010–2013
 Tim Lollar, P, 1980
 Sherm Lollar, C, 1947–1948
 Phil Lombardi, C, 1986–1987
 Dale Long, IF, 1960, 1962–1963
 Herman Long, IF, 1903
 Terrence Long, OF, 2006
 Eddie Lopat, P, 1948–1955
 Art Lopez, OF, 1965
 Héctor López, OF, 1959–1966
 Baldy Louden, IF, 1907
 Slim Love, P, 1916–1918
 Torey Lovullo, IF, 1991
 Derek Lowe, P, 2012
 Mike Lowell, IF, 1998
 Johnny Lucadello, IF, 1947
 Joe Lucey, P, 1920
 Roy Luebbe, C, 1925
 Lucas Luetge, P, 2021–present
 Matt Luke, OF, 1996
 Jerry Lumpe, IF, 1956–1959
 Scott Lusader, OF, 1991
 Sparky Lyle, P, 1972–1978
 Lance Lynn, P, 2018
 Al Lyons, P, 1944–1947
 Tyler Lyons, P, 2019-2020
 Jim Lyttle, OF, 1969–1971

M

 Duke Maas, P, 1958–1961
 Kevin Maas, DH, 1990–1993
 Bob MacDonald, P, 1995
 Danny MacFayden, P, 1932–1934
 Ray Mack, IF, 1947
 Tommy Madden, OF, 1910
 Elliott Maddox, OF, 1974–1976
 Dave Madison, P, 1950
 Lee Magee, OF, 1916–1917
 Sal Maglie, P, 1957–1958
 Stubby Magner, IF, 1911
 Jim Magnuson, P, 1973
 Fritz Maisel, IF, 1913–1917
 Hank Majeski, IF, 1946
 Frank Makosky, P, 1937
 Pat Malone, P, 1935–1937
 Pat Maloney, OF, 1912
 Al Mamaux, P, 1924
 Rube Manning, P, 1907–1910
 Joe Mantiply, P, 2019
 Mickey Mantle, OF, 1951–1968
 Jeff Manto, IF, 1999
 Josías Manzanillo, P, 1995
 Cliff Mapes, OF, 1948–1951
 Ron Marinaccio, P, 2022–present
 Roger Maris, OF, 1960–1966
 Cliff Markle, P, 1915–1916, 1924
 Jeff Marquez, P, 2011
 Jim Marquis, P, 1925
 Armando Marsans, OF, 1917–1918
 Brett Marshall, P, 2013
 Cuddles Marshall, P, 1946–1949
 Sam Marsonek, P, 2004
 Dámaso Marte, P, 2008–2010
 Billy Martin, IF, 1950–1957
 Chris Martin, P, 2015
 Jack Martin, IF, 1912
 Hersh Martin, OF, 1944–1945
 Russell Martin, C, 2011–2012
 Tippy Martinez, P, 1974–1976
 Tino Martinez, IF, 1996–2001, 2005
 Jim Mason, IF, 1974–1976
 Víctor Mata, OF, 1984–1985
 Jimmy Mathison, IF, 1902
 Hideki Matsui, OF, 2003–2009
 Don Mattingly, IF, 1982–1995
 Rudy May, P, 1974–1976, 1980–1983
 Darrell May, P, 2005
 Carlos May, OF, 1976–1977
 John Mayberry, IF, 1982
 Cameron Maybin, OF, 2019
 Carl Mays, P, 1919–1923
 Lee Mazzilli, OF, 1982
 Sport McAllister, IF, 1902
 Larry McCall, P, 1977–1978
 Brian McCann, C, 2014–2016
 Brandon McCarthy, P, 2014
 Joe McCarthy, C, 1905
 Pat McCauley, C, 1903
 Larry McClure, OF, 1910
 George McConnell, P, 1909–1913
 Mike McCormick, P, 1970
 Lance McCullers, P, 1989–1990
 Andrew McCutchen, OF, 2018
 Lindy McDaniel, P, 1968–1973
 Mickey McDermott, P, 1956
 Danny McDevitt, P, 1961
 Jim McDonald, P, 1952–1954
 Darnell McDonald, OF, 2012
 Dave McDonald, IF, 1969
 Donzell McDonald, OF, 2001
 Gil McDougald, IF, 1951–1960
 Sam McDowell, P, 1973–1974
 Jack McDowell, P, 1995
 Lou McEvoy, P, 1930–1931
 Herm McFarland, OF, 1902–1903
 Andy McGaffigan, P, 1981
 Dan McGann, IF, 1902
 Casey McGehee, IF, 2012
 Joe McGinnity, P, 1901–1902
 Lynn McGlothen, P, 1982
 Bob McGraw, P, 1917–1920
 John McGraw, IF, 1901–1902
 Deacon McGuire, C, 1904–1907
 Marty McHale, P, 1913–1915
 Irish McIlveen, OF, 1908–1909
 Tim McIntosh, C, 1996
 David McKay, P, 2022
 Bill McKechnie*, IF, 1913
 Billy McKinney, OF, 2018
 Rich McKinney, IF, 1972
 Frank McManus, C, 1904
 Norm McMillan, IF, 1922
 Tommy McMillan, IF, 1912
 Mike McNally, IF, 1921–1924
 Herb McQuaid, P, 1926
 George McQuinn, IF, 1947–1948
 Bobby Meacham, IF, 1983–1988
 Charlie Meara, OF, 1914
 Jim Mecir, P, 1996–1997
 Doc Medich, P, 1972–1975
 Mark Melancon, P, 2009–2010
 Bill Mellor, IF, 1902
 Bob Melvin, C, 1994
 Ramiro Mendoza, P, 1996–2002, 2005
 Jordy Mercer, IF, 2020
 Fred Merkle, IF, 1925–1926
 Melky Mesa, OF, 2012–2013
 Andy Messersmith, P, 1978
 Tom Metcalf, P, 1963
 Bud Metheny, OF, 1943–1946
 Hensley Meulens, OF, 1989–1993
 Bob Meusel, OF, 1920–1929
 Bob Meyer, P, 1964
 Dan Miceli, P, 2003
 Gene Michael, IF, 1968–1974
 Ezra Midkiff, IF, 1912–1913
 Doug Mientkiewicz, IF, 2007
 Pete Mikkelsen, P, 1964–1965
 Larry Milbourne, IF, 1981–1983
 Sam Militello, P, 1992–1993
 Andrew Miller, P, 2015–2016
 Bill Miller, P, 1952–1954
 Elmer Miller, OF, 1915–1922
 Jim Miller, P, 2013–2014
 John Miller, OF, 1966
 Alan Mills, P, 1990–1991
 Buster Mills, OF, 1940
 Mike Milosevich, IF, 1944–1945
 Paul Mirabella, P, 1979
 Juan Miranda, IF, 2008–2010
 Willy Miranda, IF, 1953–1954
 Bobby Mitchell, OF, 1970
 Bryan Mitchell, P, 2014–2017
 D. J. Mitchell, P, 2012
 Fred Mitchell, P, 1910
 Johnny Mitchell, IF, 1921–1922
 Sergio Mitre, P, 2009–2011
 Johnny Mize, IF, 1949–1953
 Kevin Mmahat, P, 1989
 Chad Moeller, C, 2008, 2010
 George Mogridge, P, 1915–1920
 Dale Mohorcic, P, 1988–1989
 Fenton Mole, IF, 1949
 Gustavo Molina, C, 2011
 José Molina, C, 2007–2009
 Bill Monbouquette, P, 1967–1968
 Raúl Mondesí, OF, 2002–2003
 Ed Monroe, P, 1917–1918
 Zach Monroe, P, 1958–1959
 Frankie Montas, P, 2022–present
 John Montefusco, P, 1983–1986
 Rich Monteleone, P, 1990–1993
 Jesús Montero, C, 2011
 Jordan Montgomery, P, 2017–2022
 Archie Moore, OF, 1964–1965
 Earl Moore, P, 1907
 Wilcy Moore, P, 1927–1929, 1932–1933
 Kendrys Morales, IF, 2019
 Ray Morehart, IF, 1927
 Diego Moreno, P, 2015
 Omar Moreno, OF, 1983–1985
 Mike Morgan, P, 1982
 Tom Morgan, P, 1951–1956
 George Moriarty, IF, 1906–1908
 Jeff Moronko, IF, 1987
 Hal Morris, IF, 1988–1989
 Ross Moschitto, OF, 1965–1967
 Jerry Moses, C, 1973
 Dustin Moseley, P, 2010
 Terry Mulholland, P, 1994
 Conor Mullee, P, 2016
 Charlie Mullen, IF, 1914–1916
 Jerry Mumphrey, OF, 1981–1983
 Bob Muncrief, P, 1951
 Bobby Muñoz, P, 1993–1994
 Thurman Munson, C, 1969–1979
 Bobby Murcer, OF, 1965–1974, 1979–1983
 John Ryan Murphy, C, 2013–2015
 Johnny Murphy, P, 1932–1946
 Rob Murphy, P, 1994
 Dale Murray, P, 1983–1985
 George Murray, P, 1922
 Larry Murray, OF, 1974–1976
 Mike Mussina, P, 2001–2008
 Mike Myers, P, 2006–2007

N

 Xavier Nady, OF, 2008–2009
 Jerry Narron, C, 1979
 Dan Naulty, P, 1999
 Dioner Navarro, C, 2004
 Denny Neagle, P, 2000
 Thomas Neal, OF, 2013
 Bots Nekola, P, 1929
 Chris Nelson, IF, 2013
 Gene Nelson, P, 1981
 Jeff Nelson, P, 1996–2000, 2003
 Luke Nelson, P, 1919
 Nick Nelson, P, 2020–2021
 Graig Nettles, IF, 1973–1983
 Tacks Neuer, P, 1907
 Ernie Nevel, P, 1950–1951
 Floyd Newkirk, P, 1934
 Bobo Newsom, P, 1947
 Doc Newton, P, 1905–1909
 Gus Niarhos, C, 1946–1950
 Phil Niekro, P, 1984–1985
 Joe Niekro, P, 1985–1987
 Scott Nielsen, P, 1986, 1988–1989
 Jerry Nielsen, P, 1992
 Wil Nieves, C, 2005–2007
 Harry Niles, OF, 1908
 C. J. Nitkowski, P, 2004
 Jayson Nix, UT, 2012–2013
 Otis Nixon, OF, 1983
 Rico Noel, OF, 2015
 Héctor Noesí, P, 2011
 Jerry Nops, P, 1901
 Matt Nokes, C, 1990–1994
 Irv Noren, OF, 1952–1956
 Don Nottebart, P, 1969
 Iván Nova, P, 2010–2016
 Les Nunamaker, C, 1914–1917
 Eduardo Núñez, IF, 2010–2013
 Vidal Nuño, P, 2013–2014

O

 Mike O'Berry, C, 1984
 Andy O'Connor, P, 1908
 Jack O'Connor, C, 1903
 Paddy O'Connor, C, 1918
 Darren O'Day, P, 2021
 Lefty O'Doul, OF, 1919–1922
 Steve O'Neill, C, 1925
 Paul O'Neill, OF, 1993–2001
 Jimmy O'Rourke, OF, 1908
 Johnny Oates, C, 1980–1981
 Heinie Odom, IF, 1925
 Rougned Odor, IF, 2021
 Rowland Office, OF, 1983
 Ross Ohlendorf, P, 2007–2008
 Bob Ojeda, P, 1994
 Rube Oldring, OF, 1905, 1916
 John Olerud, IF, 2004
 Bob Oliver, IF, 1975
 Joe Oliver, C, 2001
 Nate Oliver, IF, 1969
 Tyler Olson, P, 2016
 Jesse Orosco, P, 2003
 Al Orth, P, 1904–1909
 Donovan Osborne, P, 2004
 Champ Osteen, IF, 1904
 Joe Ostrowski, P, 1950–1952
 Antonio Osuna, P, 2003
 Bill Otis, OF, 1912
 Adam Ottavino, P, 2019–2020
 Josh Outman, P, 2014
 Lyle Overbay, IF, 2013
 Stubby Overmire, P, 1951
 Spike Owen, IF, 1993
 Andy Oyler, IF, 1902

P

 John Pacella, P, 1982
 Del Paddock, IF, 1912
 Juan Padilla, P, 2004
 Dave Pagan, P, 1973–1976
 Joe Page, P, 1944–1950
 Mike Pagliarulo, IF, 1984–1989
 Donn Pall, P, 1994
 Chan Ho Park, P, 2010
 Hoy Park, OF, 2021
 Blake Parker, P, 2016
 Clay Parker, P, 1989–1990
 Christian Parker, P, 2001
 Chris Parmelee, 1B, 2016
 Ben Paschal, OF, 1924–1929
 Dan Pasqua, OF, 1985–1987
 Gil Patterson, P, 1977
 Jeff Patterson, P, 1995
 Mike Patterson, OF, 1981–1982
 Scott Patterson, P, 2008
 Carl Pavano, P, 2005, 2007–2008
 Dave Pavlas, P, 1995–1996
 James Paxton, P, 2019–2020
 James Pazos, P, 2015–2016
 Steve Pearce, IF, 2012
 Monte Pearson, P, 1936–1940
 Roger Peckinpaugh, IF, 1913–1921
 Steve Peek, P, 1941
 Hipólito Peña, P, 1988
 Ramiro Peña, IF, 2009–2012
 Lance Pendleton, P, 2011
 Herb Pennock, P, 1923–1933
 Joe Pepitone, IF, 1962–1969
 Wandy Peralta, P, 2021–present
 Oswald Peraza, IF, 2022–present
 Eury Pérez, OF, 2014
 Marty Perez, IF, 1977
 Mélido Pérez, P, 1992–1995
 Pascual Pérez, P, 1990–1991
 Robert Pérez, OF, 2001
 Cecil Perkins, P, 1967
 Cy Perkins, C, 1931
 Gaylord Perry, P, 1980
 Fritz Peterson, P, 1966–1974
 Jace Peterson, OF, 2018
 Gregorio Petit, P, 2015
 Andy Pettitte, P, 1995–2003, 2007–2010, 2012–2013
 David Phelps, P, 2012–2014
 Ken Phelps, DH, 1988–1989
 Josh Phelps, DH, 2007
 Andy Phillips, IF, 2004–2007
 Eddie Phillips, C, 1932
 Jack Phillips, IF, 1947–1949
 Cy Pieh, P, 1913–1915
 Bill Piercy, P, 1917–1921
 Duane Pillette, P, 1949–1950
 Branden Pinder, P, 2015–2016
 Michael Pineda, P, 2014–2017
 Lou Piniella, OF, 1974–1984
 George Pipgras, P, 1923–1933
 Wally Pipp, IF, 1915–1925
 José Pirela, IF, 2014–2015
 Jim Pisoni, OF, 1959–1960
 Eric Plunk, P, 1989–1991
 Dale Polley, P, 1996
 Luis Polonia, OF, 1989–1990, 1993–1995, 2000
 Sidney Ponson, P, 2006, 2008
 Bob Porterfield, P, 1948–1951
 Jorge Posada, C, 1995–2011
 Scott Pose, OF, 1997
 Jack Powell, P, 1904–1905
 Jake Powell, OF, 1936–1940
 Doc Powers, C, 1905
 Martín Prado, UT, 2014
 Del Pratt, IF, 1918–1920
 George Prentiss, P, 1902
 Jerry Priddy, IF, 1941–1942
 Curtis Pride, OF, 2003
 Johnny Priest, IF, 1911–1912
 Bret Prinz, P, 2003–2004
 Scott Proctor, P, 2004–2007, 2011
 Alfonso Pulido, P, 1986
 Ambrose Puttmann, P, 1903–1905

Q

 Chad Qualls, P, 2012
 Paul Quantrill, P, 2004–2005
 Mel Queen Sr., P, 1942–1947
 Eddie Quick, P, 1903
 Jack Quinn, P, 1909–1912, 1919–1921
 Jamie Quirk, C, 1989

R

Tim Raines, OF, 1995–1998
 Dave Rajsich, P, 1978
 Edwar Ramírez, P, 2007–2009
 José Ramírez, P, 2014
 Pedro Ramos, P, 1964–1966
 Bobby Ramos, C, 1982
 John Ramos, C, 1991
 Domingo Ramos, IF, 1978
 Lenny Randle, IF, 1979
 Willie Randolph, IF, 1976–1988
 Cody Ransom, IF, 2008–2009
 Clay Rapada, P, 2012
 Vic Raschi, P, 1946–1953
 Dennis Rasmussen, P, 1984–1987
 Darrell Rasner, P, 2006–2008
 Shane Rawley, P, 1982–1984
 Jeff Reardon, P, 1994
 Tim Redding, P, 2005
 Jack Reed, OF, 1961–1963
 Jimmie Reese, IF, 1930–1931
 Kevin Reese, OF, 2005–2006
 Rob Refsnyder, IF, 2015–2017
 Hal Reniff, P, 1961–1967
 Bill Renna, OF, 1953
 Tony Rensa, C, 1933
 Roger Repoz, OF, 1964–1966
 Rick Reuschel, P, 1981
 Dave Revering, IF, 1981–1982
 Al Reyes, P, 2003
 Allie Reynolds, P, 1947–1954
 Bill Reynolds, C, 1913–1914
 Mark Reynolds, IF, 2013
 Rick Rhoden, P, 1987–1988
 Gordon Rhodes, P, 1929–1932
 Harry Rice, OF, 1930
 Antoan Richardson, OF, 2014
 Bobby Richardson, IF, 1955–1966
 Nolen Richardson, IF, 1935
 Branch Rickey*, C, 1907
 Stephen Ridings, P, 2021
 Dave Righetti, P, 1979–1990
 José Rijo, P, 1984
 Royce Ring, P, 2010
 Danny Rios, P, 1997
 Juan Rivera, OF, 2001–2003
 Mariano Rivera, P, 1995–2013
 Rubén Rivera, OF, 1995–1996
 Mickey Rivers, OF, 1976–1979
 Anthony Rizzo, IF, 2021–present
 Phil Rizzuto, IF, 1941–1956
 Roxey Roach, IF, 1910–1911
 Brian Roberts, 2B, 2014
 Dale Roberts, P, 1967
 David Robertson, P, 2008–2014, 2017–2018
 Gene Robertson, IF, 1928–1929
 Andre Robertson, IF, 1981–1985
 Aaron Robinson, C, 1943–1947
 Bill Robinson, OF, 1967–1969
 Bruce Robinson, C, 1979–1980
 Eddie Robinson, IF, 1954–1956
 Hank Robinson, P, 1918
 Jeff Robinson, P, 1990
 Shane Robinson, OF, 2018
 Wilbert Robinson, C, 1901–1902
 Alex Rodriguez, IF, 2004–2013, 2015–2016
 Aurelio Rodríguez, IF, 1980–1981
 Carlos Rodríguez, IF, 1991
 Edwin Rodríguez, IF, 1982
 Ellie Rodríguez, C, 1968
 Felix Rodríguez, P, 2005
 Henry Rodríguez, OF, 2001
 Iván Rodríguez, C, 2008
 Joely Rodríguez, P, 2021
 Chaz Roe, P, 2014
 Gary Roenicke, OF, 1986
 Oscar Roettger, IF, 1923–1924
 Esmil Rogers, P, 2014–2015
 Tom Rogers, P, 1921
 Kenny Rogers, P, 1996–1997
 Jay Rogers, C, 1914
 George Rohe, IF, 1901
 Jim Roland, P, 1972
 Red Rolfe, IF, 1931–1942
 Sal Romano, P, 2021
 Austin Romine, C, 2011, 2013–2019
 Adonis Rosa, P, 2019
 Buddy Rosar, C, 1939–1942
 Larry Rosenthal, OF, 1944
 Steve Roser, P, 1944–1946
 Ernie Ross, P, 1902
 Braggo Roth, OF, 1921
 Jerry Royster, IF, 1987
 Muddy Ruel, C, 1917–1920
 Dutch Ruether, P, 1926–1927
 Red Ruffing, P, 1930–1946
 Nick Rumbelow, P, 2015
 Allen Russell, P, 1915–1919
 Kevin Russo, IF/OF, 2010
 Marius Russo, P, 1939–1946
 Babe Ruth, OF, 1920–1934
 Brendan Ryan, IF, 2013–2015
 Rosy Ryan, P, 1928
 Blondy Ryan, IF, 1935

S

 CC Sabathia, P, 2009–2019
 Johnny Sain, P, 1951–1955
 Lenn Sakata, IF, 1987
 Mark Salas, C, 1987
 Jack Saltzgaver, IF, 1932–1937
 Billy Sample, OF, 1985
 Celerino Sánchez, IF, 1972–1973
 Gary Sánchez, C, 2015–2021
 Humberto Sánchez, P, 2008
 Rey Sánchez, IF, 1997, 2005
 Rómulo Sánchez, P, 2010
 Roy Sanders, P, 1918
 Deion Sanders, OF, 1989–1990
 Scott Sanderson, P, 1991–1992
 Charlie Sands, DH, 1967
 Fred Sanford, P, 1949–1951
 Amauri Sanit, P, 2011
 Rafael Santana, IF, 1988
 Sergio Santos, P, 2015
 Bronson Sardinha, OF, 2007
 Don Savage, IF, 1944–1945
 Rick Sawyer, P, 1974–1975
 Steve Sax, IF, 1989–1991
 Ray Scarborough, P, 1952–1953
 Germany Schaefer, IF, 1916
 Harry Schaeffer, P, 1952
 Roy Schalk, IF, 1932
 Art Schallock, P, 1951–1955
 Wally Schang, C, 1921–1925
 Bob Schmidt, C, 1965
 Butch Schmidt, IF, 1909
 Clarke Schmidt, P, 2020–present
 Crazy Schmit, P, 1901
 Johnny Schmitz, P, 1952–1953
 Pete Schneider, P, 1919
 Dick "Ducky" Schofield, IF, 1966
 Paul Schreiber, P, 1945
 Art Schult, IF, 1953
 Al Schulz, P, 1912–1914
 Don Schulze, P, 1989
 Pi Schwert, C, 1914–1915
 Everett Scott, IF, 1922–1925
 George Scott, IF, 1979
 Rodney Scott, IF, 1982
 Rod Scurry, P, 1985–1986
 Scott Seabol, IF, 2001
 JP Sears, P, 2022–present
 Ken Sears, C, 1943
 Bob Seeds, OF, 1936
 Kal Segrist, IF, 1952
 Fernando Seguignol, IF, 2003
 Kip Selbach, OF, 1902
 George Selkirk, OF, 1934–1942
 Ted Sepkowski, IF, 1947
 Hank Severeid, C, 1926
 Luis Severino, P, 2015–2019, 2021–present
 Joe Sewell, IF, 1931–1933
 Richie Sexson, IF, 2008
 Cy Seymour, OF, 1901–1902
 Howie Shanks, OF, 1925
 Bobby Shantz, P, 1957–1960
 Billy Shantz, C, 1960
 Bob Shawkey, P, 1915–1927
 Spec Shea, P, 1947–1951
 Al Shealy, P, 1928
 George Shears, P, 1912
 Jimmy Sheckard, OF, 1902
 Tom Sheehan, P, 1921
 Gary Sheffield, OF, 2004–2006
 Justus Sheffield, P, 2018
 Rollie Sheldon, P, 1961–1965
 Skeeter Shelton, OF, 1915
 Roy Sherid, P, 1929–1931
 Pat Sheridan, OF, 1991
 Dennis Sherrill, IF, 1978–1980
 Ben Shields, P, 1924–1925
 Charlie Shields, P, 1902
 Steve Shields, P, 1988
 Bob Shirley, P, 1983–1987
 Urban Shocker, P, 1916–1917, 1925–1928
 Tom Shopay, OF, 1967–1969
 Ernie Shore, P, 1919–1920
 Bill Short, P, 1960
 Chasen Shreve, P, 2015–2018
 Norm Siebern, IF, 1956–1959
 Rubén Sierra, OF, 1995–1996, 2003–2005
 Charlie Silvera, C, 1948–1956
 Ken Silvestri, C, 1941–1947
 Dave Silvestri, IF, 1992–1995
 Hack Simmons, IF, 1912
 Harry Simpson, OF, 1957–1958
 Dick Simpson, OF, 1969
 Duke Sims, C, 1973–1974
 Scott Sizemore, IF, 2014
 Bill Skiff, C, 1926
 Joel Skinner, C, 1986–1988
 Camp Skinner, OF, 1922
 Lou Skizas, OF, 1956
 Bill "Moose" Skowron, IF, 1954–1962
 Roger Slagle, P, 1979
 Don Slaught, C, 1988–1989
 Enos Slaughter, OF, 1954–1959
 Aaron Small, P, 2005–2006
 Roy Smalley, IF, 1982–1984
 Walt Smallwood, P, 1917–1919
 Aleck Smith, C, 1902
 Caleb Smith, P, 2017
 Charley Smith, IF, 1967–1968
 Elmer Smith, OF, 1922–1923
 Joe Smith, C, 1913
 Keith Smith, IF, 1984–1985
 Klondike Smith, OF, 1912
 Lee Smith, P, 1993
 Matt Smith, P, 2006
 Harry Smythe, P, 1934
 Chappie Snodgrass, OF, 1901
 J. T. Snow, IF, 1992
 Eric Soderholm, IF, 1980
 Luis Sojo, IF, 1996–2001, 2003
 Tony Solaita, IF, 1968
 Donovan Solano, IF, 2016
 Yangervis Solarte, IF, 2014
 Alfonso Soriano, IF, 1999–2003, 2013–2014
 Rafael Soriano, P, 2011–2012
 Steve Souchock, OF, 1946–1948
 Jim Spencer, IF, 1978–1981
 Shane Spencer, OF, 1998–2002
 Charlie Spikes, OF, 1972
 Russ Springer, P, 1992
 Bill Stafford, P, 1960–1965
 Jake Stahl, IF, 1908
 Roy Staiger, IF, 1979
 Tuck Stainback, OF, 1942–1945
 Gerry Staley, P, 1955–1956
 Charley Stanceu, P, 1941–1946
 Andy Stankiewicz, IF, 1992–1993
 Mike Stanley, C, 1992–1995, 1997
 Fred Stanley, IF, 1973–1980
 Giancarlo Stanton, OF, DH, 2018–present
 Mike Stanton, P, 1997–2002, 2005
 Dick Starr, P, 1947–1948
 Dave Stegman, OF, 1982
 Dutch Sterrett, OF, 1912–1913
 Bud Stewart, OF, 1948
 Chris Stewart, C, 2008, 2012–2013
 Lee Stine, P, 1938
 Kelly Stinnett, C, 2006
 Snuffy Stirnweiss, IF, 1943–1950
 Tim Stoddard, P, 1986–1988
 Mel Stottlemyre, P, 1964–1974
 Hal Stowe, P, 1960
 Darryl Strawberry, OF, 1995–1999
 Marlin Stuart, P, 1954
 Bill Stumpf, IF, 1912–1913
 Tom Sturdivant, P, 1955–1959
 Johnny Sturm, IF, 1941
 Tanyon Sturtze, P, 2004–2006
 Bill Sudakis, IF, 1974
 Steve Sundra, P, 1936–1940
 Ichiro Suzuki, OF, 2012–2014
 Dale Sveum, IF, 1998
 Anthony Swarzak, P, 2016
 Ed Sweeney, C, 1908–1915
 Nick Swisher, OF, 2009–2012
 Ron Swoboda, OF, 1971–1973

T

 Jameson Taillon, P, 2021–present
 Fred Talbot, P, 1966–1969
 Vito Tamulis, P, 1934–1935
 Frank Tanana, P, 1993
 Masahiro Tanaka, P, 2014–2020
 Jesse Tannehill, P, 1903
 Tony Tarasco, OF, 1999
 Danny Tartabull, OF, 1992–1995
 Stephen Tarpley, P, 2018–2019
 Mike Tauchman, OF, 2019–2021
 Wade Taylor, P, 1991
 Zack Taylor, C, 1934
 Mark Teixeira, IF, 2009–2016
 Frank Tepedino, IF, 1967–1972
 Walt Terrell, P, 1989
 Ralph Terry, P, 1956–1957, 1959–1964
 Jay Tessmer, P, 1998–2000, 2002
 Dick Tettelbach, OF, 1955
 Bob Tewksbury, P, 1986–1987
 Marcus Thames, OF, 2002, 2010
 Ira Thomas, C, 1906–1907
 Justin Thomas, P, 2012
 Lee Thomas, OF, 1961
 Myles Thomas, P, 1926–1929
 Stan Thomas, P, 1977
 Gary Thomasson, OF, 1978
 Homer Thompson, C, 1912
 Kevin Thompson, OF, 2006–2007
 Ryan Thompson, OF, 2000
 Tommy Thompson, P, 1912
 Jack Thoney, OF, 1902, 1904
 Hank Thormahlen, P, 1917–1920
 Matt Thornton, P, 2014
 Marv Throneberry, IF, 1955–1959
 Mike Thurman, P, 2002
 Luis Tiant, P, 1979–1980
 Dick Tidrow, P, 1974–1979
 Bobby Tiefenauer, P, 1965
 Eddie Tiemeyer, IF, 1909
 Ray Tift, P, 1907
 Bob Tillman, C, 1967
 Thad Tillotson, P, 1967–1968
 Dan Tipple, P, 1915
 Wayne Tolleson, IF, 1986–1990
 Brett Tomko, P, 2009
 Earl Torgeson, IF, 1961
 Gleyber Torres, IF, 2018–present
 Rusty Torres, OF, 1971–1972
 Ronald Torreyes, IF, 2016–2018
 Mike Torrez, P, 1977
 César Tovar, OF, 1976
 Josh Towers, P, 2009
 Billy Traber, P, 2008
 Matt Tracy, P, 2015
 Bubba Trammell, OF, 2003
 Tom Tresh, OF, 1961–1969
 Jose Trevino, C, 2022–present
 Gus Triandos, C, 1953–1954
 Lou Trivino, P, 2022–present
 Steve Trout, P, 1987
 Virgil Trucks, P, 1958
 Frank Truesdale, IF, 1914
 Troy Tulowitzki, IF, 2019
 Bob Turley, P, 1955–1962
 Jim Turner, P, 1942–1945
 Chris Turner, C, 2000

U

 George Uhle, P, 1933–1934
 Tom Underwood, P, 1980–1981
 Bob Unglaub, IF, 1904
 Cecil Upshaw, P, 1974
 Gio Urshela, IF, 2019–2021

V

 Raúl Valdés, P, 2011
 Breyvic Valera, IF, 2019
 Elmer Valo, OF, 1960
 Russ Van Atta, P, 1933–1935
 Dazzy Vance, P, 1915, 1918
 Joe Vance, P, 1937–1938
 John Vander Wal, OF, 2002
 Hippo Vaughn, P, 1908–1912
 Bobby Vaughn, IF, 1909
 Javier Vázquez, P, 2004, 2010
 Bobby Veach, OF, 1925
 Randy Velarde, IF, 1987–1995, 2001
 Andrew Velazquez, IF, 2021
 Otto Vélez, OF, 1973–1976
 Mike Vento, OF, 2005
 Robin Ventura, IF, 2002–2003
 José Veras, P, 2006–2009
 Joe Verbanic, P, 1967–1970
 Frank Verdi, IF, 1953
 Sammy Vick, OF, 1917–1920
 Ron Villone, P, 2006–2007
 José Vizcaíno, IF, 2000
 Luis Vizcaíno, P, 2007
 Luke Voit, IF, 2018–2021

W

 Cory Wade, P, 2011–2012
 Jake Wade, P, 1946
 Tyler Wade, IF, 2017–2021
Dick Wakefield, OF, 1950
 Jim Walewander, IF, 1990
 Curt Walker, OF, 1919
 Dixie Walker, OF, 1931–1936
 Neil Walker, IF, 2018
 Mike Wallace, P, 1974–1975
 Joe Walsh, C, 1910–1911
 Jimmy Walsh, OF, 1914
 Roxy Walters, C, 1915–1918
 Danny Walton, OF, 1971
 Paul Waner, OF, 1944–1945
 Chien-Ming Wang, P, 2005–2009
 Jack Wanner, IF, 1909
 Pee-Wee Wanninger, IF, 1925
 Aaron Ward, IF, 1917–1926
 Gary Ward, OF, 1987–1989
 Joe Ward, IF, 1909
 Pete Ward, IF, 1970
 Jack Warhop, P, 1908–1915
 Adam Warren, P, 2012–2015, 2016–2018
 George Washburn, P, 1941
 Claudell Washington, OF, 1986–1988, 1990
 Gary Waslewski, P, 1970–1971
 Allen Watson, P, 1999–2000
 Bob Watson, IF, 1980–1982
 Roy Weatherly, OF, 1943–1946
 David Weathers, P, 1996–1997
 Jim Weaver, P, 1931
 Jeff Weaver, P, 2002–2003
 Tyler Webb, P, 2017
 Ryan Weber, P, 2022
 Dave Wehrmeister, P, 1981
 Lefty Weinert, P, 1931
 Greg Weissert, P, 2022–present
 David Wells, P, 1997–1998, 2002–2003
 Ed Wells, P, 1929–1932
 Vernon Wells, OF, 2013
 Charley Wensloff, P, 1943–1947
 Julian Wera, IF, 1927, 1929
 Billy Werber, IF, 1930, 1933
 Dennis Werth, IF, 1979–1981
 Jake Westbrook, P, 2000
 John Wetteland, P, 1995–1996
 Stefan Wever, P, 1982
 Zelous Wheeler, 3B, 2014
 Kevin Whelan, P, 2011
 Steve Whitaker, OF, 1966–1968
 Gabe White, P, 2003–2004
 Roy White, OF, 1965–1979
 Rondell White, OF, 2002
 Wally Whitehurst, P, 1996
 George Whiteman, OF, 1913
 Mark Whiten, OF, 1997
 Terry Whitfield, OF, 1974–1976
 Chase Whitley, P, 2014–2015
 Ed Whitson, P, 1985–1986
 Kemp Wicker, P, 1936–1938
 Al Wickland, OF, 1919
 Bob Wickman, P, 1992–1996
 Chris Widger, C, 2002
 Bob Wiesler, P, 1951–1955
 Bill Wight, P, 1946–1947
 Ted Wilborn, OF, 1980
 Ed Wilkinson, OF, 1911
 Bernie Williams, OF, 1991–2006
 Bob Williams, C, 1911–1913
 Gerald Williams, OF, 1992–1996, 2001–2002
 Harry Williams, IF, 1913–1914
 Jimmy Williams, IF, 1901–1907
 Mason Williams, OF, 2015–2017
 Stan Williams, P, 1963–1964
 Todd Williams, P, 2001
 Walt Williams, OF, 1974–1975
 Archie Wilson, OF, 1951–1952
 Craig Wilson, OF, 2006
 Enrique Wilson, IF, 2001–2004
 George Wilson, OF, 1956
 Justin Wilson, P, 2015, 2021
 Kris Wilson, P, 2006
 Pete Wilson, P, 1908–1909
 Snake Wiltse, P, 1902–1903
 Gordie Windhorn, OF, 1959
 Dave Winfield, OF, 1981–1988, 1990
 Randy Winn, OF, 2010
 DeWayne Wise, OF, 2012
 Jay Witasick, P, 2001
 Mickey Witek, IF, 1949
 Mike Witt, P, 1990–1993
 Whitey Witt, OF, 1922–1925
 Mark Wohlers, P, 2001
 Asher Wojciechowski, P, 2021
 Barney Wolfe, P, 1903–1904
 Harry Wolter, OF, 1910–1913
 Harry Wolverton, IF, 1912
 Dooley Womack, P, 1966–1968
 Tony Womack, IF, 2005
 Kerry Wood, P, 2010
 Gene Woodling, OF, 1949–1954
 Ron Woods, OF, 1969–1971
 Dick Woodson, P, 1974
 Hank Workman, IF, 1950
 Chase Wright, P, 2007
 Jaret Wright, P, 2005–2006
 Ken Wright, P, 1974
 Yats Wuestling, IF, 1930
 John Wyatt, P, 1968
 Butch Wynegar, C, 1982–1986
 Jimmy Wynn, OF, 1977

Y

 Miguel Yajure, P, 2020
 Ed Yarnall, P, 1999–2000
 Kirby Yates, P, 2016
 George Yeager, C, 1902
 Joe Yeager, IF, 1905–1906
 Stan Yerkes, P, 1901
 Jim York, P, 1976
 Kevin Youkilis, IF, 2013
 Chris Young, OF, 2014–2015
 Curt Young, P, 1992
 Eric Young Jr., DH, 2016
 Ralph Young, IF, 1913

Z

 Tom Zachary, P, 1928–1930
 Mike Zagurski, P, 2013
 Jack Zalusky, C, 1903
 George Zeber, IF, 1977–1978
 Rollie Zeider, IF, 1913
 Todd Zeile, IF, 2003
 Guy Zinn, OF, 1911–1912
 Bill Zuber, P, 1943–1946
 Paul Zuvella, IF, 1986–1987

External links
 BR batting statistics
 BR pitching statistics

Roster
Major League Baseball all-time rosters